Club Deportivo Santa Fe is a football team based in Santa Fe, Granada. Formed in 1931, from the 2010–11 onwards, the senior team doesn't compete in any category.

The club's home ground is Estadio Las Américas.

Season to season

5 seasons in Tercera División

References

External links
Futbolme.com profile
LaPreferente.com profile

Football clubs in Andalusia
Association football clubs established in 1931
Divisiones Regionales de Fútbol clubs
1931 establishments in Spain